Jersey Boys is a jukebox musical with music by Bob Gaudio, lyrics by Bob Crewe, and book by Marshall Brickman and Rick Elice. It is presented in a documentary-style format that dramatizes the formation, success and eventual break-up of the 1960s rock 'n' roll group The Four Seasons. The musical is structured as four "seasons", each narrated by a different member of the band who gives his own perspective on its history and music. Songs include "Big Girls Don't Cry", "Sherry", "December, 1963 (Oh, What a Night)", "My Eyes Adored You", "Stay", "Can't Take My Eyes Off You", "Walk Like A Man", "Who Loves You", "Working My Way Back to You" and "Rag Doll", among others.

The musical premiered at the La Jolla Playhouse in 2004 and ran on Broadway from 2005 to 2017, and since its debut it has been on two North American national tours and two national tours of the UK and Ireland. There have been productions of the show in London's West End, Las Vegas, Chicago, Toronto, Melbourne and other Australian cities, Singapore, South Africa, the Netherlands, Japan, Dubai, and China. Jersey Boys won four 2006 Tony Awards including Best Musical, and the 2009 Laurence Olivier Award for Best New Musical.

Development
In the early 2000s, Bob Gaudio, an original Four Seasons member, sought to make a musical from the discography of the band. He hired book writers Rick Elice and Marshall Brickman, and director Des McAnuff (at the suggestion of Michael David of Dodger Theatricals). Brickman suggested creating a show about the band's history, instead of repurposing their songs for an independent story the way ABBA did with Mamma Mia!. Brickman was drawn to the project because: "It's a classic American story. It's rags to riches, and back to rags."

Little was known to the public about the group's history prior to the premiere of the musical, because the magazines of the era did not write much about them. In their research, Brickman and Elice were surprised to find that the members had prison records, which might have prevented their music from being played if it had been publicized when they were active. According to Gaudio, "Back then, things were a little clean-cut, don't forget, so the idea of our story getting out was horrifying to us." Other bands of the time projected street-tough images, but The Four Seasons cleaned themselves up in order to be palatable for mainstream listeners.

Brickman and Elice also used material from interviews with surviving Four Seasons members Gaudio, Frankie Valli and Tommy DeVito. While the Four Seasons as a group made headlines, as individuals they did not receive much press due to groups like the Beatles receiving the attention.  Brickman noted that each member had his own perspective on what happened during their tenure as a group. Of the three, they approached DeVito last, who told them, "Don't listen to those guys. I'll tell you what really happened." Elice said that getting DeVito's version was a "eureka moment" and the contradiction in their stories ended up being incorporated in the musical for a Rashomon effect. The writers were also contacted by family members of the late mob boss Gyp DeCarlo to ensure that he would be portrayed respectfully.

Although Gaudio was part of the initial development team, he was not involved in the creative process during tryouts, and only met the cast once the show had premiered. Gaudio, Valli and DeVito had decided to step back from the show's creative process because they lacked objectivity, and they left it to Brickman, Elice and McAnuff to take the story to the stage. However, Gaudio and Valli still had final say on whether to end the show if they did not like it.

Productions
Jersey Boys premiered at the La Jolla Playhouse at University of California, San Diego, in an out-of-town tryout on October 5, 2004, and ran through January 16, 2005.  Christian Hoff, David Norona, Daniel Reichard and J. Robert Spencer played The Four Seasons. At the end of the tryout, Norona, who originated the role of Frankie Valli, was replaced by John Lloyd Young, who originally had auditioned for the role of Tommy DeVito.

Broadway
The musical began previews on Broadway on October 4, 2005, and officially opened on November 6, 2005, at the August Wilson Theatre. The cast starred John Lloyd Young as Frankie Valli, Christian Hoff as Tommy DeVito, Daniel Reichard as Bob Gaudio and J. Robert Spencer as Nick Massi. The musical was directed by Des McAnuff, at the time the artistic director at La Jolla Playhouse, with choreography by Sergio Trujillo. The Broadway production had 38 previews. It reached its 4093rd performance on September 22, 2015, making it the 12th longest-running show on Broadway. Notable cast replacements include Andy Karl and Richard H. Blake as Tommy DeVito, Sebastian Arcelus as Bob Gaudio, Micheal Longoria, who originated the role of Joe Pesci, and Ryan Molloy, who originated the role in the West End production, both as Frankie Valli. The Broadway production closed on January 15, 2017 after 4,642 performances, with Mark Ballas as the final Frankie Valli.

Off-Broadway
Only months after closing on Broadway, it was announced that the musical would reopen Off-Broadway, following the example of shows such as Avenue Q. It opened November 22, 2017, at New World Stages. The production featured the same script and score as the Broadway production, but four fewer cast members, a smaller theater, and lower ticket prices. The producers of the Off-Broadway Jersey Boys are Dodger Theatricals, which also handled the show's Broadway and touring productions. On March 12, 2020, production was suspended due to the COVID-19 pandemic; it remained suspended until November 2021. The musical reopened on November 15, 2021 and announced on April 22 that it would close on Sunday, May 22, 2022.

US Tour
The first national U.S. tour of the musical began on December 10, 2006, at the Curran Theatre in San Francisco and went on to play in 38 cities. The cast starred Christopher Kale Jones as Frankie Valli, Deven May as Tommy DeVito, Erich Bergen as Bob Gaudio, and Micheal Ingersoll as Nick Massi. Jersey Boys played at the Forrest Theatre in Philadelphia, where it broke the box office record eight times before moving on to a return engagement in Boston.

In May 2007, while the first national tour continued (with Steve Gouveia from the original Broadway cast as Nick Massi), a second company debuted at the Curran and ended as an open-ended run at Chicago's Bank of America Theatre, beginning on October 5, 2007.  The Chicago cast appeared on stage in the 2007 Emmy Awards in a tribute to HBO's The Sopranos. A special holiday return engagement played at the Curran Theatre from November 20 through December 30, 2007, starring Rick Faugno as Frankie Valli, Andrew Rannells as Bob Gaudio, Bryan McElroy as Tommy DeVito and Jeff Leibow as Nick Massi. The majority of this cast became the original Las Vegas cast, which debuted at The Palazzo Hotel on Sunday, May 3, 2008, in the newly built Jersey Boys Theatre. The show temporarily closed on January 1, 2012, and reopened on March 6, 2012, at Paris Las Vegas. On June 7, 2016, it was announced that Jersey Boys would be ending its Las Vegas show on September 18, 2016.

In late 2014, a tour of the United States performed in a number of U.S. cities, including Denver in December.

A tour in 19 cities of the United States performed from March 2016 through March 2017.

West End
The musical made its West End debut at London's Prince Edward Theatre in February 2008. The creative team were the same as for the Broadway production. Principal cast were Ryan Molloy as Frankie Valli, Stephen Ashfield as Bob Gaudio, Glenn Carter as Tommy DeVito, Philip Bulcock as Nick Massi, Stuart Milligan as DeCarlo and Tom Lorcan as Donnie/Knuckles. The production won the Laurence Olivier Award for Best New Musical. Molloy performed the lead role for six years, making him the longest-running star in a West End musical. The production moved to the Piccadilly Theatre on March 15, 2014, the same day that John Lloyd Young assumed the role of Frankie Valli. The production closed after nine years on March 26, 2017.

In October 2020, it was announced that Jersey Boys would return to the West End at the Trafalgar Theatre in April 2021. Due to the COVID-19 pandemic in the United Kingdom the production was postponed, with previews finally beginning 28 July and opening night set for 10 August 2021. A new cast was also announced. The musical is currently booking until 1 October 2023.

UK Tour
A national UK tour was launched in autumn 2014, opening at Palace Theatre, Manchester, where it ran from September 4 to October 4. This production has the same creative team as the Broadway and West End productions. The cast includes Tim Driesen reprising his role from the Dutch production as Frankie Valli, with Stephen Webb as Tommy DeVito, Sam Ferriday as Bob Gaudio and Lewis Griffiths as Nick Massi. A second national tour began in December 2017 at the New Alexandra Theatre Birmingham until May 2019. A third UK and Ireland tour will begin at the New Wimbledon Theatre from November 2021 with dates until November 2022.
Currently, a run is taking place at the Trafalgar theatre in London with a cast featuring Ben Joyce as Frankie Valli, Adam Bailey as Bob Gaudio, Benjamin Yates as Tommy De Vito and Karl James Wilson as Nick Massi. This will finish on the 21st of May 2022

Australia and New Zealand
The Australian production opened at the Princess Theatre in Melbourne on July 4, 2009. Principal cast members were Bobby Fox as Frankie Valli, Stephen Mahy as Bob Gaudio, Scott Johnson as Tommy DeVito and Glaston Toft as Nick Massi. The Melbourne production closed on July 25, 2010 and the Sydney production opened in September 2010. The Sydney production closed on December 18, 2011. Jersey Boys then opened in Auckland in April 2012 with the new touring cast. Jeff Madden from Canada starred as Frankie Valli, with Declan Egan as Bob, Ant Harkin as Tommy, and Glaston Toft continuing on as Nick. The Jersey girls were: Francine and others played by Kat Hoyos, Lorraine and others played by Michelle Smitheram and Mary Delgado and others played by Lisa Adam. running through June 17, 2012. Following from New Zealand, the same cast then returned to Australia starting a national tour - Brisbane, return season of Melbourne, Adelaide and Perth. The show ran until June 30, 2013.

An Australian tour played in Sydney, Melbourne and Brisbane between 2018 and 2019. The initial cast announcement had Bernard Angel as Frankie Valli, Cameron MacDonald as Tommy DeVito, Thomas McGuane as Bob Gaudio and Glaston Toft as Nick Massi. However, due to unforeseen personal circumstances, Angel pulled out of the show and was replaced with the Frankie alternate, Ryan Gonzalez, with Daniel Raso as the new Frankie alternate.

Canada
Due to the success of the national tour's long stop at Toronto Centre for the Arts in Toronto, Ontario, in autumn 2008, a Toronto production opened on December 12, 2008 with a new, mostly Canadian cast that included Jeremy Kushnier and Jenny Lee Stern from the first national tour. This production closed on August 22, 2010, on the show's second anniversary.

The Netherlands
A Dutch production, produced by Stage Entertainment, opened at the Beatrix Theatre in Utrecht on September 22, 2013. This production features the songs performed in English and the dialogue performed in Dutch, making it the first time the show has been performed in a language other than English. The cast includes Tim Driesen as Frankie Valli, René van Kooten as Tommy DeVito, Dieter Spileers as Bob Gaudio and Robbert van den Bergh as Nick Massi.

Japan
A Japanese production, directed by Shuntaro Fujita, opened at the Theatre Crea in Tokyo on July 1, 2016. The cast includes Akinori Nakagawa as Frankie Valli.

International tours
An international tour with an all-South African cast ran in Singapore at the Marina Bay Sands resort from November 23, 2012, to January 27, 2013.  The production then performed in Johannesburg, South Africa, at the Teatro at Montecasino on April 3, 2013, and at Artscape Cape Town on June 19, 2013. This company also performed at the Zorlu Center PSM, the Performing Arts Center in Istanbul, Turkey from November 13–24, 2013 and in South Korea from January 17 to March 23, 2014. The same production performed an edited family-friendly version without profanity at Istana Budaya, Malaysia from April 15 to 27, 2014. This cast includes Grant Almiral as Frankie Valli, Daniel Buys as Tommy DeVito, Kenneth Meyer as Bob Gaudio and Emmanuel Castis as Nick Massi.

An international tour of Jersey Boys opened at the Dubai Opera in October 2017. This production then embarked on a tour of China from November 2017 - January 2018. For both legs of this tour, The Four Seasons were played by Luke Street/Jonathan Vickers (alternating the role of Frankie Valli), Andrew Bryant (Tommy Devito), Matt Blaker (Bob Gaudio), and Nick Martland (Nick Massi).

Jersey Boys is currently playing on Norwegian Cruise Liner, Norwegian Bliss. The show premiered on the new ship in 2018.

Synopsis

Act I
Spring
"Ces soirées-là", a modern pop-rap song that was released in 2000, is performed. Tommy DeVito arrives, introduces himself and explains how the song is a cover of The Four Seasons' "December, 1963 (Oh, What a Night)". He offers to tell the story of the band, explaining how he started out with the group "The Variety Trio" with his brother Nick DeVito and friend Nick Massi, eventually discovering teenager Frankie Castelluccio and taking him under his wing, teaching him everything he knows ("The Early Years: A Scrapbook"). During these early years Nick Massi helped train Frankie to sing, Tommy went in and out of prison, Frankie changed his last name to Valli, Tommy and Frankie developed a good relationship with mob boss Gyp DeCarlo, and Frankie fell in love with and married Mary Delgado. Musically, the band was still struggling and kept changing their name and sound but without any dramatic success. One day friend and fellow Jersey boy Joe Pesci comes up to Tommy and says that he knows a singer-songwriter who'd make the perfect fourth for their band: Bob Gaudio.

Summer
Bob Gaudio takes over the narration, telling the audience that no matter what Tommy says, he was not plucked from obscurity by him, since he already had a hit single with "Short Shorts". Bob goes with Joe Pesci to see the band perform, and is immediately impressed by Frankie's voice. Bob performs a song he had just written: "Cry for Me" on piano, which Frankie, Nick Massi and then Tommy joining in with vocals, bass and guitar respectively. They negotiate an agreement, though Tommy is at first skeptical that Bobby (then still a teenager) will be good for the band. The band eventually gets a contract with producer Bob Crewe but only to sing back-up ("Backup Sessions"). Crewe insists that the band has an "identity crisis" and needs to make a firm decision on a name and a sound. The band name themselves after The Four Seasons bowling alley, and Bobby writes them three songs that finally propel them to stardom: "Sherry", "Big Girls Don't Cry" and "Walk Like a Man". In the wake of their success, Bob also chalks up a personal first by losing his virginity ("December, 1963 (Oh, What a Night)"). The band's success means that they tour a lot more, along the way discovering the girl band The Angels ("My Boyfriend's Back"). Unfortunately, the constant touring strains Frankie's marriage to Mary, and they eventually divorce ("My Eyes Adored You"). The band continues to enjoy chart successes ("Dawn (Go Away)") until after a concert the band is approached by a loan shark out to claim money owed by Tommy ("Walk Like a Man (reprise)").

Act II
 Fall
Nick Massi, taking over as Narrator, explains that Bob was so focused on the band's musical success and future that he could not see that the band had been in trouble for some time. Tommy has been racking up debts, and a forgotten bill during a previous tour lands the band in jail over the weekend, which strains things between Tommy and Bob ("Big Man in Town"). Nick observes that Tommy became jealous of Frankie's success and closeness with Bobby, and attempted to seduce Frankie's new girlfriend Lorraine. The two never confronted each other about it, but the old friendship was not what it used to be. When the loan shark approaches the band for the $150,000 owed by Tommy, Frankie goes to Gyp DeCarlo for help despite Tommy's insistence that he does not need it ("Beggin'"). The band, Gyp, and the loan shark come to agreement: Tommy is to be "sequestered" in Las Vegas where the mob can keep an eye on him, and the band will willingly cover the debt, along with an additional half a million in unpaid taxes that Tommy kept hidden from the group. At this time, Nick declares that he is tired of everything and wants out, despite Frankie and Bob trying to convince him to stay ("Stay/Let's Hang On!").

 Winter
Frankie takes over narration, explaining that though he owes Tommy a great deal, he is aware that their relationship was not ideal, and he never understood why Nick decided to leave. Frankie and Bob find replacements to keep the band a quartet ("Opus 17 (Don't You Worry 'Bout Me)") until Bobby announces that he has never been comfortable in the spotlight and that Frankie should be a single, i.e. Frankie Valli and the Four Seasons. In his personal life, Frankie's relationship with his daughter Francine is strained and he breaks up with Lorraine ("Bye, Bye, Baby (Baby, Goodbye)"). Frankie continues to have success thanks to Bobby's songs, and hits jackpot with "C'mon Marianne" and the almost-never-released "Can't Take My Eyes Off You" which Bobby fights to get airplay for. Along with the success of "Working My Way Back to You", Frankie and Bobby finally finish paying off Tommy's debts, and Frankie's life is good until his daughter Francine dies from a drug overdose ("Fallen Angel")

 Finale
Bob Crewe describes The Four Seasons' 1990 induction into the Rock and Roll Hall of Fame, which reunited the original four members on stage one last time ("Rag Doll"). Each member takes a moment to address the audience in turn, explaining his pride at having been with the band and briefly notes what he did afterwards ("Who Loves You").

Principal roles and casts

Music

Musical numbers

 Act I
 "Ces soirées-là (Oh What a Night) - Paris, 2000" – French Rap Star Yannick and Backup Group
 "Silhouettes" – Tommy DeVito, Nick Massi, Nick DeVito and Frankie Valli ☆
 "You're the Apple of My Eye" – Tommy DeVito, Nick Massi and Nick DeVito ☆
 "I Can't Give You Anything But Love" – Frankie Valli ☆
 "Earth Angel" – Tommy DeVito and Full Company ☆
 "A Sunday Kind of Love" – Frankie Valli, Tommy DeVito, Nick Massi and Nick's Date ☆
 "My Mother's Eyes" – Frankie Valli ☆
 "I Go Ape" – The Four Lovers ★
 "(Who Wears) Short Shorts" – The Royal Teens ☆
 "I'm in the Mood for Love" / "Moody's Mood for Love" – Frankie Valli ☆
 "Cry for Me" – Bob Gaudio, Frankie Valli, Tommy DeVito and Nick Massi
 "An Angel Cried" – Hal Miller and The Rays □
 "I Still Care" – Miss Frankie Nolan and The Romans □
 "Trance" – Billy Dixon and The Topix □
 "Sherry" – The Four Seasons
 "Big Girls Don't Cry" – The Four Seasons
 "Walk Like a Man" – The Four Seasons
 "December, 1963 (Oh, What a Night)" – Bob Gaudio and Full Company
 "My Boyfriend's Back" – The Angels
 "My Eyes Adored You" – Frankie Valli, Mary Delgado and The Four Seasons
 "Dawn (Go Away)" – The Four Seasons
 "Walk Like a Man" (reprise) – Full Company ★

 Act II
 "Big Man in Town" – The Four Seasons
 "Beggin'" – The Four Seasons
 "Stay" – Bob Gaudio, Frankie Valli and Nick Massi ■
 "Let's Hang On! (To What We've Got)" – Bob Gaudio and Frankie Valli ■
 "Opus 17 (Don't You Worry 'bout Me)" – Bob Gaudio, Frankie Valli and The New Seasons ■
 "Bye Bye Baby" – Frankie Valli and The Four Seasons ■
 "C'mon Marianne" – Frankie Valli and The Four Seasons
 "Can't Take My Eyes Off You" – Frankie Valli
 "Working My Way Back to You" – Frankie Valli and The Four Seasons
 "Fallen Angel" – Frankie Valli
 "Rag Doll" – The Four Seasons
 "Who Loves You" – The Four Seasons and Full Company
 "December, 1963 (Oh, What a Night) reprise" - The Four Seasons and Full Company ★

☆ On the cast album in "The Early Years: Scrapbook"

★ Not on the cast album

□ On the cast album in "Backup Sessions"

■ On the cast album in "Medly: Stay/Let's Hang On/Opus 17 (Don't You Worry 'Bout Me)/Bye, Bye, Baby"

Instrumentation
The score for Jersey Boys requires a small orchestra with ten musicians: three keyboards, two guitars, bass, drums, two woodwind players, and trumpet. The first woodwind player doubles on alto and tenor saxophone, clarinet, flute, and oboe. The second woodwind part doubles on tenor and baritone sax, clarinet, and bass clarinet. The trumpet also doubles on flugelhorn.

Critical response
Ben Brantley of The New York Times wrote, "THE CROWD GOES WILD. I'm talking about the real, mostly middle-aged crowd at the August Wilson Theater, who seem to have forgotten what year it is or how old they are or, most important, that John Lloyd Young is not Frankie Valli. And everything that has led up to that curtain call feels, for just a second, as real and vivid as the sting of your hands clapping together."

Charles Spencer from The Daily Telegraph wrote: "Overpaid, over-sexed and over here, it will, I suspect be some time before London says Bye Bye Baby (Baby Goodbye) to the PHENOMENAL Jersey Boys." Benedict Nightingale from The Times said, "Oh What a Night. There were times when I felt that the performers were making even the Beatles sound somewhat lacking in musical texture."

Recording and adaptations

An original cast recording was made by Rhino Entertainment, Jersey Boys: Original Broadway Cast Recording (Rhino R2 73271), released in November 2005, which won the 2007 Grammy Award for Best Musical Show Album. In February 2008, the album was certified Gold, having shipped more than 500,000 copies in the US. In October 2009, the cast album was certified Platinum, selling over 1,000,000 copies in the United States.

A movie adaptation of the musical, with John Lloyd Young reprising his role as Frankie Valli, and directed by Clint Eastwood, was released in 2014. A ProShot taping of the musical starring Nick Jonas as Frankie Valli, Andy Karl as Tommy DeVito, CJ Pawlikowski as Bob Gaudio, and Matt Bogart as Nick Massi is currently in the works.

Charity performances
The West End cast of Jersey Boys appeared as a guest act for the Royal Variety Performance 2008, which was staged at the London Palladium on December 11 in the presence of senior members of the Royal family. The Royal Variety Performance is a gala event held annually at a major British theatre, to raise money for the Entertainment Artistes' Benevolent Fund. In 2010, The West End cast of Jersey Boys performed a show, with the profits going to Children in Need. The show ended with Pudsey Bear joining in to sing a medley, and raised £60,150 for the charity. In 2009 the cast also appeared as a guest act for Children in Need.

Jersey Boys Chicago has been honored two years in a row at the Broadway Cares event for being the top fundraiser in the Tour category. In 2008, Jersey Boys Chicago raised $220,000 for BC/EFA.

For every ticket sold for every Broadway performance in the month of October 2010, $1 was donated to the VH1 Save the Music Foundation. Jersey Boys aimed to raise funds to restore one full music education program in a New York City school. The show eventually raised $43,521, enough to restore the instrumental music education program at PS 85 in the Bronx. Plans were made to donate additional funds raised to a second VH1 Save The Music Foundation grant recipient school.

The Boys in Concert
Four actors of the original Broadway production, Christian Hoff, Michael Longoria, Daniel Reichard and J. Robert Spencer, launched a concert tour titled The Boys in Concert in 2010. Frankie Valli, Bob Gaudio, Marshall Brickman and Rick Elice sued the production, claiming that it "steals songs, stage elements and copyrighted logo" that imply that it is an authorized spin-off of Jersey Boys. The production was rebranded as The 4 Hitmen, and Hoff, Longoria, Reichard and Spencer counter-sued, claiming that the accusations were false, and alleging the use of "bully tactics" in an "effort to injure the livelihood and the reputations" of the actors. On September 23, 2010, Valli and company dropped the original suit, on the condition that the name of the performance is changed to distance itself from Jersey Boys. As of May 2019, this production is still active, and is named The Midtown Men.

Awards and honors

Original Broadway production

Original London production

In popular culture
The HBO series The Sopranos made several nods to Jersey Boys.  For example:
Frankie Valli played Mob captain Rusty Millio, one of a group of just-released prison felons referred to the show's fictional journalists as "the Class of 2004".
In The Sopranos episode, "The Ride" (May 7, 2006), Marianucci Gaultieri accompanies several other Green Grove Retirement Home residents on a bus trip to see Jersey Boys.
And the Season 6 episode, "Walk Like a Man" (May 6, 2007), is titled after the Four Seasons' 1963 song.
In the 2010 comedy The Other Guys, NYPD detectives Hoitz and Gamble, played by Mark Wahlberg and Will Ferrell accept two Jersey Boys tickets as a bribe and attend the show.

References

External links
 
Official Jersey Boys Website
Official Broadway Website
Official London Website

2005 musicals
American rock musicals
Broadway musicals
West End musicals
Revues
Musicals inspired by real-life events
Tony Award for Best Musical
Plays set in the 20th century
Musicals by Marshall Brickman
Plays set in New Jersey
Jukebox musicals
Tony Award-winning musicals
Cultural depictions of pop musicians